Anthony Darvise Davis (born March 7, 1969) is a former American football linebacker in the National Football League who played from 1993 to 2000. He played college football at the University of Utah. In 2008, Anthony joined the coaching staff at MidAmerica Nazarene University in Olathe, Kansas to coach the linebackers.

References

External links

MidAmerica Nazarene Pioneers bio

1969 births
Living people
American football linebackers
Utah Utes football players
Seattle Seahawks players
Kansas City Chiefs players
Green Bay Packers players
Baltimore Ravens players
MidAmerica Nazarene Pioneers football coaches
People from Kennewick, Washington